Dimcho Nenov (born 19 May 1967) is a Bulgarian football manager and former footballer. He was managing Neftochimic Burgas. However, due to poor results, he was sacked from managing the club.. He is currently employed as an assistant manager of Lokomotiv GO.

References

1969 births
Living people
Bulgarian footballers
Bulgarian football managers
Association footballers not categorized by position